Teka was a Spanish professional cycling team that existed from 1976 to 1990. The main sponsor for its entire history was the multinational kitchen and bath company Teka. The team's major victory was the general classification of the 1982 Vuelta a España with Marino Lejarreta.

References

Cycling teams based in Spain
Defunct cycling teams based in Spain
1976 establishments in Spain
1990 disestablishments in Spain
Cycling teams established in 1976
Cycling teams disestablished in 1990